Growing Up in New Guinea is a 1930 publication by Margaret Mead. The book is about her encounters with the indigenous people of the Manus Province of Papua New Guinea before they had been changed by missionaries and other western influences. She compares their views on family, marriage, sex, child rearing, and religious beliefs to those of westerners.

The book has been rereleased several times since its original release under different publishers.

See also

References

1930 non-fiction books
Anthropology books
Books about Oceania
Books by Margaret Mead
English-language books
New Guinea